This is a list of Thistle sailboat championships.

National Championships 
Source: Thistle Class Association

References

Thistle (dinghy)